Hiatulopsis aureoflava is a species of mushroom producing fungus in the family Agaricaceae.

Taxonomy 
It was described in 1989 by the German mycologist Rolf Singer who classified it as Hiatulopsis aureoflava.

Description 
Hiatulopsis aureoflava is a very small golden yellow mushroom with white flesh.

Cap: 7-11mm wide and ovate to campanulate. The surface is golden with a fine, dense coating of flocculose (woolly) scales and the margins are yellow. Some scales may be removed by rain. Gills: Free to sub-free, crowded and whitish. They are narrow and ascending. Stem: 3.6cm tall and 1.8mm thick tapering to a 4mm wide base where white mycelium may be present but sclerotia are not observed. The surface is yellowish with woolly to powdery scales (flocculose-pulverulent) with a golden base with a tomentose coating. There is no ring or volva. Spores: Ellipsoidal without a germ pore, hyaline, non-amyloid. 7-10 x 5.5-6.5 μm. Basidia: 22-34 x 11-13 μm. Four spored. Smell: Indistinct.

Etymology 
The specific epithet aureoflava derives from the Latin aureo meaning golden and flava meaning yellow.

Habitat and distribution 
The specimens studied by Singer were found growing solitary or gregariously on the ground in the tropical forests of Brazil, 30km North of Manaus.

References 

Agaricaceae
Fungi described in 1989
Fungi of South America
Taxa named by Rolf Singer